Santo Tomas, officially the Municipality of Santo Tomas, is a 4th class municipality in the province of Pampanga, Philippines. According to the 2020 census, it has a population of 42,846 people.

It is a mainly agricultural and fishing community; industry includes casket manufacture, ceramics, and carpentry.

Etymology
The town's name is derived from Baliwag ("tardy" in Spanish) a reference to local habit of arriving late for Mass. Baliwag, whose original name was Santo Tomas, had its Patron, St. Thomas the Apostle. He is also called Doubting Thomas or Didymus (meaning "twin," as does "Thomas" in Aramaic) and was one of the Twelve Apostles of Jesus. The Patronal Feast is celebrated yearly on the 21st of December from the town's original founding date of 1792.

History
On September 15, 1792, Santo Tomas was severed from its parent Minalin, Pampanga. On May 4, 1899, the town was under the U.S. Force's administration. On January 2, 1905, it was ceded to San Fernando, Pampanga until 1905. On October 12, 1951, Executive Order No. 476 (issued by Elpidio Quirino) created Santo Tomas and its five barrios of San Matias, San Vicente, San Bartolome, Santo Rosario and Santo Tomas with the seat of government at barrio San Vicente.

On January 11, 1952, the municipality of Santo Tomas was re-inaugurated. The first municipal hall was temporarily at the house of late Mayor Patricio Gomez, the first municipal mayor.

In 1955, RA 1250, the San Matias seat was transferred to Santo Tomas. Presidential Decree No. 1441 was issued by President Ferdinand E. Marcos on June 11, 1978, transferring the seat of municipal government from Barangay SantoTomas to Barangay San Vicente.

The town became the site of the bloody encounter between Filipino and American forces during Philippine Revolution known as the Battle of Santo Tomas.

Geography
The municipality of Santo Tomas, the smallest town in Pampanga, is at the heart of the province. The capital city of San Fernando bounds it on the north-west the municipality of San Simon on the north-east, the municipality of Minalin on the south-east and Bacolor on the west.

Barangays
Santo Tomas is politically subdivided into seven barangays:
 Moras De La Paz
 Poblacion
 San Bartolome
 San Matias
 San Vicente
 Santo Rosario (Pau)
 Sapa (Santo Niño)

Climate

Demographics

Economy 

In the records of Department of Trade and Industry (Philippines), the town holds the title “casket capital of Central Luzon.” It is home to 300 family-owned casket businesses that each produce about 80 caskets monthly or a total production of 24,000 a month. Casket capital of the Philippines, Oct. 22, 2012

Tourism
Santo Tomas' main attractions and events are:
 The yearly Easter Sunday Flower Scattering Festival or Sabuaga Festival (from sabuag and sampaga which means scatter flowers) originated from Easter Sunday “Salubong” (April 8, 2012) where estabats scatter flowers.
 First Evacuation Center and Multi-Purpose Hall at Barangay Santo Tomas, July 5, 2010.
 The Northville 12 ECCD Center and Health Center, July 15, 2010.
 Municipal Hall Annex, Donato B. Pangilinan, Sr. building, also the New Public Market and Police Station, inaugurated on the 60th anniversary of Santo Tomas founding, October 12, 2011.

Government
Pursuant to the local government the political seat of the municipality is at the Municipal Town Hall. The gobernadorcillo is the chief executive who holds office in the Presidencia. During the American rule (1898–1946), the elected mayor and local officials, including the appointed ones, hold office at the Municipal Town Hall. The legislative and executive departments perform their functions in the Sangguniang Bayan (Session Hall) and Municipal Trial Court, respectively, and are in the Town Hall.

Santo Tomas' incumbent mayor is Johnny A. Sambo and the municipal vice mayor is Gloria P. Ronquillo.

On July 23, 2012, incumbent mayor Joselito Naguit filed his counter-affidavit to the Office of the Deputy Ombudsman for Luzon on graft charges against him by former municipal administrator Rodelio Garcia. The mayor said over the weekend that "the P9.5 million in cash advances he allegedly made for the months of May to November 2011 were all returned, accounted for to the last centavo and deposited in the municipal fund of Santo Tomas."

In March 2012, Mayor Naguit opened the LGU's approved project under the Local Government Support Fund (LGSF) on February 29, 2011: "P 700, 000 Improvement and Concreting of Balangcas Road."

Churches

St. Thomas the Apostle Parish Church
The 1767 St. Thomas the Apostle Parish Church (Santo Tomas, Pampanga) belongs to the Roman Catholic Archdiocese of San Fernando. The Parish celebrated its 250th Founding Anniversary in 2017. The feast is every Easter Sunday and July 3 and its current Parish Priest was Rev. Fr. Marcelino M. Miranda of the Vicariate of Christ the King It has a population of 20,202, with Catholics, 19,833.

On February 14, 2004, the Parish Pastoral Center and Convent were blessed and inaugurated by Bishop Paciano Aniceto. On October 16, 2004, the columbarium, mortuary and museum were blessed.

San Matias Parish Church
The 1962 San Matias Parish Church belongs to the Roman Catholic Archdiocese of San Fernando.
Its incumbent parish priest is Rev. Marius P. Roque, of the Vicariate of Christ, under Vicar Forane, Rev. Reynaldo D. dela Cruz. It has a population of 16,672 with Catholics, 16,005. The former parish priest was Rev. Marlon Cunanan and parochial vicar was Rev. Nestor Figueroa.

References

Pampanga History

External links

 Santo Tomas Profile at PhilAtlas.com
 [ Philippine Standard Geographic Code]
 Website of Santo Tomas
 Local Governance Performance Management System

Municipalities of Pampanga
Establishments by Philippine executive order